Frida och farfar ("Frida and Grandfather) was the 1974 edition of Sveriges Radio's Christmas Calendar.

Plot
It's December, and Frida has broken a leg. She misses school and her friends. It's boring at home, and living on a minor Bohuslän island in Sweden, it's hard to rech mainland Sweden in the wintertime. With her parents working, she stays home with her grandfather on her father's side (who actually is her great grandfather on her father's side).

References
 

1974 radio programme debuts
1974 radio programme endings
Sveriges Radio's Christmas Calendar
Sweden in fiction